The Controller General of Defence Accounts heads the Defence Accounts Department), which is one of the oldest government organisations in India. The office functions under the Ministry of Defence of India and is the cadre controlling authority of the Indian Defence Accounts Service, an organised Group 'A' Civil Service of Government of India.

Current c 
Currently, the post is vacant. Rashika Chaube, FADS, is holding the additional charge of the Controller General of Defence Accounts at present.

References

External links

Indian government officials
Accounting in India
Military of India